David A.T. Harper is a British palaeontologist, specialising in fossil brachiopods and numerical methods in palaeontology. He is Professor of Palaeontology in Earth Sciences at Durham University. In December 2014 he began his term as President of the Palaeontological Association.

Bibliography 
Harper was previously Professor of Palaeontology and Head of Geology in the Natural History Museum of Denmark, University of Copenhagen. He has published over 10 books and monographs, and also over 250 scientific articles. He is co-writer, with Øyvind Hammer, of the software package PAST. In recent years he has been addressing some of the major events in the history of life, for example the Cambrian Explosion, Great Ordovician Biodiversification Event and the end Ordovician mass extinctions.  His research programmes have taken him to many parts of the world including Chile, China, Greenland, Russia and Tibet. 
His research has been recognized by foreign membership of the Royal Danish Academy of Sciences and Letters, an Einstein Professorship in the Chinese Academy of Sciences and a D.Sc. from Queen's University Belfast. 
Between 2011-2013 he was Deputy Head of Colleges (Research and Scholarly Activities) at Durham university and served as Principal of Van Mildert College between 2011-2021.

Selected publications 
 Paleontological Data Analysis, Hammer and Harper (2008)
 Introduction to Paleobiology and the Fossil Record, Benton and Harper (2012)
 The Making of Ireland: Landscapes in Geology, Williams and Harper (1999)
 Fossils and Strata, Late Ordovician Brachiopods from West-Central Alaska: Systematics, Ecology and Palaeobiogeography, Rasmussen, Blodgett, and Harper (2012)
 William King D. SC.(1809-1886) A Palaeontological Tribute, Harper (1988)
 Basic Palaeontology (with Michael Benton), Prentice Hall (1997)

References 

Year of birth missing (living people)
Living people
British palaeontologists
Academics of Durham University
Principals of Van Mildert College, Durham